MTV's Greatest Hits was a pop music program on the European television channel MTV. It started on 19 March 1990, and between 1991 and 1994 was presented by Paul King, with Pip Dann, Richie Rich and others substituting for King in his absence. King used a variety of catchphrases. MTV's Greatest Hits gained in popularity through the years. After Paul King's departure the show continued on MTV with different VJs, and ended in or about 1996.

Content
The main concept was to show all the greatest hits from the 1960s, 1970s, 1980s and early 1990s. The program featured videos from Madonna, Prince, Duran Duran and others.

The show was broadcast at 4pm and then repeated at 10pm CET. In 1993, the program was aired at 1pm and then at 8pm

Farewell to Paul King 
The last edition with Paul King was aired on 29 July 1994. He said: "I am pulling out some of those videos that I really do think deserve to be called great and classic".

His choices were:
Laid Back - Bakerman
Talking Heads - Once In A Lifetime
David Bowie - Ashes To Ashes  
The Cure - Close To Me
Depeche Mode - Enjoy The Silence 
A House - Endless Art 
The The - Heartland
Prince - I Wish U Heaven
Michael Jackson - Thriller (uncut version)

References 

MTV original programming